The Chairman of the Council of Ministers of the Estonian Soviet Socialist Republic was the second-highest official in the Estonian Soviet Socialist Republic, which was in turn a part of the Soviet Union.

Below is a list of office-holders:

See also 
Prime Minister of Estonia

Footnotes

Sources 

Politics of Estonia
Estonian SSR
Lists of political office-holders in Estonia
List
List